Simon Mesfin (born 9 June 1980) is a Norwegian football administrator and former player, best known as the director of sports in Lillestrøm SK.

His parents immigrated to Norway from Eritrea in the 1970s. He came through the youth system and played several seasons for Skjetten SK, including a couple of seasons when the team was monikered Romerike Fotball. In 2004 he moved to Strømmen IF, and also appeared for Drøbak-Frogn IL, then Skjetten, Strømmen for a second time. He rejoined Skjetten for the next season. In 2009 he moved on to Sørumsand IF as playing assistant manager.

In 2011 Mesfin was hired by Lillestrøm SK as an administrative manager, tasked with the integration of foreign and young players, helping them off the field. He was soon upgraded to assist the director of sports, Torgeir Bjarmann. He also aided LSK Kvinner in an administrative role. While this was his daytime job, in 2012–13 he also coached Flisbyen BK in the afternoons.

He did however continue as assisting director of sports in Lillestrøm, and was promoted to director of sports in the summer of 2017.

References

1980 births
Living people
People from Skedsmo
Norwegian people of Eritrean descent
Norwegian footballers
Skjetten SK players
Drøbak-Frogn IL players
Strømmen IF players
Lillestrøm SK non-playing staff
Norwegian sports executives and administrators

Association footballers not categorized by position